Nikola Stojanović (Никола Стојановић; born 17 February 1995) is a Serbian professional footballer who plays as a midfielder for Mohammedan in the I-League.

Playing career

Mohammedan Sporting

In June 2021, Stojanović moved to India and signed with Mohammedan Sporting that competes in the I-League. On 18 August, he debuted for the club in 2021–22 Calcutta Premier Division, with a 3–0 win against Southern Samity. He scored a goal in that match. He was part of the team's 2021 Durand Cup campaign, in which he captained all their matches, and reached to the final, defeating FC Bengaluru United 4–2. On 3 October 2021, they lost the title winning match 1–0 to ISL side FC Goa.

He also appeared in the 2021–22 Calcutta Premier Division league, in which Mohammedan reached to the final, defeating United SC 1–0. On 18 November, Mohammedan clinched their 12th Calcutta Football League title after forty long years, defeating Railway FC 1–0 under his captaincy. Under Stojanović's captaincy, Mohammedan for the first time, ran for their maiden national league title in 2021–22 I-League season, but finished as runners-up after a 2–1 defeat to Gokulam Kerala at the end.

After leaving the club in earlier the season, Stojanović rejoined Mohammedan on 6 November 2022.

Honours
Mohammedan Sporting
Calcutta Football League: 2021
Durand Cup runner-up: 2021
I-League runner-up: 2021–22

References

External links
 

1995 births
Living people
Footballers from Belgrade
Serbian footballers
Association football forwards
Serbian expatriate footballers
FK Partizan players
Ergotelis F.C. players
FK Sinđelić Beograd players
OFK Beograd players
FK Sloboda Užice players
FC Minsk players
A.E. Sparta P.A.E. players
OFK Bačka players
OFK Petrovac players
FK Dečić players
Super League Greece players
Serbian First League players
Belarusian Premier League players
Serbian SuperLiga players
Serbian expatriate sportspeople in Greece
Serbian expatriate sportspeople in Belarus
Serbian expatriate sportspeople in Montenegro
Expatriate footballers in Greece
Expatriate footballers in Belarus
Expatriate footballers in Montenegro
Calcutta Football League players